is a Japanese internet entrepreneur, founder and director until 2011 of the "paperboy" company, and founder of the "studygift" fundraising site. He stood for election as governor of Tokyo in 2014, running an online campaign and obtaining 1.8% of the vote.

Early life
Ieiri was born in Fukuoka Prefecture. He dropped out of high school after less than a year and became a "hikikomori" (shut-in), teaching himself computer programming and socializing on a bulletin board system using a computer he received as a middle school graduation gift. After working various jobs including delivering newspapers and graphic design, he started his first company, a web design and server rental firm called "paperboy & co."

Paperboy company
By the age of 27 he had built the company to have 72 employees and 850 million yen in annual revenue; at the age of 29, he became the youngest CEO to have a company listed on JASDAQ when Paperboy went public. Ieiri resigned as a director of paperboy in March 2011.

Other enterprises
Ieiri branched out into several new businesses following the paperboy IPO, establishing a restaurant and cafe and setting up the "liverty" group of online content creators.  In May 2012, at the request of two Waseda University students, he established an online platform called "studygift" to provide crowd funding for individuals' educational expenses. The site was quickly criticized by online commenters for its lack of clarity regarding the use of donated funds, the activity of the students listed on the site and the possibility that they would not actually return to school. In 2013, he led a campaign on Twitter to send donations to a new mother who could not pay the hospital bills for her child's birth without going into debt.

Candidate for governor of Tokyo
In 2014, Ieiri announced his candidacy for governor of Tokyo. He stated on Twitter that he would run if his tweet was retweeted 1,000 times, and achieved this milestone within 30 minutes; one of the retweeters was noted internet entrepreneur Takafumi Horie (who provided the 3 million yen deposit necessary for Ieiri to stand in the election). Ieiri ran an unorthodox campaign by Japanese standards, in which he raised \7.2 million in campaign funds by crowd funding and conducted live streaming of his campaign headquarters. Instead of proposing his own policy platform, he set up an online platform to gather policy ideas from his supporters. He obtained 1.8% of the vote.

References

External links
Official website

1978 births
Japanese chief executives
Japanese company founders
Living people
Tokyo gubernatorial candidates